Dawson Mercer (born October 27, 2001) is a Canadian professional ice hockey centre for the New Jersey Devils of the National Hockey League (NHL). He was drafted 18th overall by the Devils in the 2020 NHL Entry Draft.

Early life
Mercer was born on October 27, 2001, in Bay Roberts, Newfoundland to parents Charlotte and Craig. His father is a powerline technician while his mother manages a convenience store. His father also coached in the Conception Bay North area and had a tryout with the American Hockey League’s St. John's Maple Leafs. Besides his father, both of his younger siblings also play ice hockey; his brother is a goaltender while his sister is a defenceman. His cousin Zachery Bennett also plays ice hockey.

Playing career

Junior
Growing up in Newfoundland, Mercer played for the Tri Pen Ice U15 AAA in the Newfoundland Bantam AAA league. After recording 68 points in 24 games, Mercer chose to play prep hockey with the Bishop's College School under-18 varsity team at the age of 15. He chose to leave his home province in part to increase his playing ability and join his cousin. In his first season at Bishop, he finished third in scoring with 18 goals and 30 assists through 51 games to earn a high ranking by the Quebec Major Junior Hockey League's (QMJHL) Central Scouting. Mercer was eventually drafted eighth overall by the Drummondville Voltigeurs in the 2017 QMJHL Draft.

As a rookie in the QMJHL, Mercer recorded 26 points through 68 games. During the season, he was selected for Team Canada's Black U17 team at the World Under-17 Hockey Challenge. In the 2019–20 season, he finished with 60 points in 42 games and was nominated for the Michael Bossy Trophy.

Professional
On December 24, 2020, Mercer was signed to a three-year, entry-level contract by the New Jersey Devils. He made his NHL debut the following season on October 15, 2021, against the Chicago Blackhawks. During the game, he recorded his first career NHL assist on a goal by Andreas Johnsson. On October 19, Mercer scored his first NHL goal against the Seattle Kraken.

International play

 

Mercer won a gold medal playing for Team Canada in the 2020 World Junior Ice Hockey Championships. He again represented Canada at the 2021 World Junior Ice Hockey Championships, and won a silver medal.

Career statistics

Regular season and playoffs

International

Awards and honors

References

External links
 

2001 births
Living people
Bishop's College School alumni
Canadian ice hockey centres
Chicoutimi Saguenéens (QMJHL) players
Drummondville Voltigeurs players
Ice hockey people from Newfoundland and Labrador
National Hockey League first-round draft picks
New Jersey Devils draft picks
New Jersey Devils players